Hsieh Cheng-peng and Yang Tsung-hua were the defending champions but chose not to defend their title.

Matthew Ebden and Divij Sharan won the title after defeating Nam Ji-sung and Song Min-kyu 7–6(7–4), 5–7, [10–3] in the final.

Seeds

Draw

References

External links
 Main draw

Jinan International Open - Men's Doubles
2019 Men's Doubles